The Muslim Council of Scotland (MCS) is an umbrella organisation of Islamic organisations in Scotland. Founded in 2007, the registered charity  is based in Glasgow.

Approximately 50 organisations are affiliated with the MCS, including mosques, madrassas, media bodies and community centres and groups.

See also
Islam in Scotland

References

External links
Official website

Charities based in Glasgow
Islam in Scotland
2007 establishments in Scotland
2007 in Islam
Islamic organizations established in 2007
Religion in Glasgow
Islamic organisations based in the United Kingdom